Ubiquitin-conjugating enzyme E2 D2 is a protein that in humans is encoded by the UBE2D2 gene.

Function 

The modification of proteins with ubiquitin is an important cellular mechanism for targeting abnormal or short-lived proteins for degradation. Ubiquitination involves at least three classes of enzymes: ubiquitin-activating enzymes, or E1s, ubiquitin-conjugating enzymes, or E2s, and ubiquitin-protein ligases, or E3s. This gene encodes a member of the E2 ubiquitin-conjugating enzyme family. This enzyme functions in the ubiquitination of the tumor-suppressor protein p53, which is induced by an E3 ubiquitin-protein ligase. Two alternatively spliced transcript variants have been found for this gene and they encode distinct isoforms.

Interactions 

UBE2D2 has been shown to interact with:

 Baculoviral IAP repeat-containing protein 3, 
 NEDD4,
 PJA1, 
 PJA2,  and
 UBE3A.

References

Further reading